Alperton is a London Underground station on the Uxbridge branch of the Piccadilly line. The station is between Sudbury Town and Park Royal, in Travelcard Zone 4. It is located on Ealing Road (A4089 road) a short distance from the junction with Bridgewater Road (A4005) and is close to Alperton Bus Garage and the Paddington branch of the Grand Union Canal. 
The station was refurbished in 2006.

History
Alperton was opened on 28 June 1903 by the District Railway (now the District line), with its name being "Perivale Alperton", on its new extension to South Harrow on electrified tracks from Park Royal & Twyford Abbey, which it was opened five days earlier. This new extension was, together with the existing tracks back to Acton Town, the first section of the Underground's surface lines to be electrified and operate electric traction instead of steam. The deep-level tube lines open at that time (City & South London Railway, Waterloo & City Railway and Central London Railway) had been electrically powered from the start.

The station was subsequently renamed "Alperton" on 7 October 1910.

On 4 July 1932, from Ealing Common to South Harrow, the District line service was replaced by the Piccadilly line. Piccadilly line services were extended to run west of its original terminus at Hammersmith, sharing the route with the District. It non-stops stations between Hammersmith and Acton Town, apart from Turnham Green, which the Piccadilly only calls during early mornings and late evenings. At Acton Town, the District and Piccadilly lines use separate platforms. They join back west of Acton Town towards Ealing Common.

Incidents and accidents
On 2 March 1944 during the Second World War, bomb damage prevented through services to and from Uxbridge for five days.

Design
The original station building was a modest timber-framed structure built in 1910. In 1930 and 1931, this was demolished and replaced by a new station in preparation for the handover of the branch from the District line to the Piccadilly line. The new station was designed by Charles Holden in a modern European style using brick, reinforced concrete and glass. Like other stations such as Sudbury Town and Sudbury Hill to the north and others that Holden designed elsewhere, and also for the east and west Piccadilly line extensions such as Acton Town and Oakwood, Alperton station features a tall block-like ticket hall rising above a low horizontal structure that contains station offices and shops. The brick walls of the ticket hall are punctuated with panels of clerestory windows and the structure is capped with a flat concrete slab roof.

Alperton formerly shared with Greenford (on the Central line) the distinction of being one of the only two stations to have an escalator going up to the platforms. In 1955, an up escalator was installed to the eastbound platform. It had originally been used at the South Bank exhibition of the Festival of Britain. The escalator fell out of use in 1988, and its machine remains in place behind a wall.

Services and connections

Services
The off-peak service in trains per hour (tph) is:
6tph to Cockfosters (Eastbound)
3tph to Rayners Lane (Westbound)
3tph to Uxbridge via Rayners Lane (Westbound)

The peak time service in trains per hour (tph) is:
12tph to Cockfosters (Eastbound)
6tph to Rayners Lane (Westbound)
6tph to Uxbridge via Rayners Lane (Westbound)

During disruption on the District Line, Piccadilly Line trains have sometimes been used to provide a service to Ealing Broadway, either by diverting some trains bound for Rayners Lane and Uxbridge, or as a shuttle from Acton Town. Trains may also run along the District Line tracks from Hammersmith to Acton Town in order to serve those stations with no platforms on the Piccadilly Line.

Connections
London Buses routes 79, 83, 224, 245, 297, 483, 487 and night route N83 serve the station, with route 297 providing a 24-hour service.

Notes and references

Notes

References

Bibliography

Further reading

External links

 

 Showing structure of reinforced concrete roof

 With appearance marred by rooftop safety barriers

Tube stations in the London Borough of Brent
Former Metropolitan District Railway stations
Railway stations in Great Britain opened in 1903
Piccadilly line stations
Charles Holden railway stations
1903 establishments in England